Christy Scott Cashman is an American actress, writer, producer and philanthropist.

Cashman is a founding partner, actor, producer, and writer for Saint Aire Productions. She is credited as an Executive Producer for The Kids Are All Right. She has appeared in many films from 1999-2014 including, The Forger, American Hustle, Edge of Darkness, The Pink Panther 2, the short film Descendants alongside Whoopi Goldberg, Serial Intentions, and many more.

She serves on the board of Grub Street, Inc. Commonwealth Shakespeare Company and Epiphany School  and is a founding member of the American Film Institute National Council. She is involved in many other organizations including the PEN New England the regional chapter of PEN America, Samaritans American Red Cross and Friends of Boston's Homeless

She won Woman of the Year in 2012 with the Leukemia & Lymphoma Society

Cashman formerly co-hosted "Open Book Club" on New England Cable News and hosted on "Back Story" for CBS show "Style Boston."

She is currently working on the development of Consenses, Charity Warriors and a show based on Kilkea Castle.

References

External links

American film actresses
Year of birth missing (living people)
Living people
20th-century American actresses
21st-century American actresses
American film producers
American women screenwriters
American women film producers